Cesáreo Fernández Duro (25 February 1830 – 5 June 1908) was a Spanish professional naval officer, writer, scholar and historian.

Childhood and family background
Fernández Duro was born of a good family in Zamora; that is to say, a noble family. His father, Francisco Fernández Torneros, a lawyer, was entitled to use Don before his name, which means that his mother, Teresa Ramona Duro, was a Doña (Latin Dominus and Domina, "master" and "mistress.")  Cesáreo was a Don, no doubt, but history prefers for him his rank at retirement from the navy, Capitán.

Cesáreo was his given name, but, knowing his other names and those of his parents, the native English speaker must beware of interpreting them according to English rules. In English, one would expect Duro to be a Patronymic surname, and that Cesáreo and his father would have descended from a long line of Duro's. Then we see that he seems to have his mother's last name, which would indicate, in English, that his mother was not married to his father. Such an interpretation would be a total travesty. Catholic families in Spain did not have unmarried partners. The problem is entirely English: Spanish names are formed according to Spanish naming customs, which, apart from the unique given name, are totally different from the English.

Fernandez Duro is a compound of one of his father's surnames and one of his mother's. A person had two surnames. Thus the parents at the birth of their child selected two out of four possible surnames. The paternal names often had preference, but not always. Cesáreo's parents could select one of Fernández and Torneros and one of Ramona and Duro, which they did. The selection must be made before birth registration. English just lists the names, as though one were a middle name. Spanish uses y, "and:" Fernandez y Duro. There is no such thing as a middle name. Some languages concede to the y with a dash: Fernandez-Duro. In literature one sees Fernandez Duro most often, but this is the whole last name, not an example of the English sometime preference of the middle name for a first name.

The practice is somewhat frustrating for the descendants of Americanized Spanish families, who are looking for a patronymic line in the old country. No such line is recorded. "Duro" was passed around among different families without regard to patrilineal descent. As a surname, Duro mainly comes from Spain, as does Fernandez. As Zamora is on the Portuguese border, there are Portuguese Duro's. In Spanish it is not a given name. Thus Duro's in other languages have different etymologies. The etymology in Spanish and Portuguese is uncertain. Any connection to the Duero River running through Zamora is uncertain (the river runs through a lot of places in two countries).

Zamora itself is not much of an ancient ancestral home. The name is believed to be from the Arabic, dating to the time of the Moorish occupation. After the Reconquista the Moors had to leave, abandoning the town to the Spanish.

The etymology of Fernández is better known. It is a Germanic name, which is not surprising, as Germanic settlers left remnants of their tribal names on at least two regions of Spain, Catalonia ("Gothilandia") and Andalusia ("Vandalusia"). Zamora was not in those regions, but Fernández was popular in Iberia, being distributed across lines, rather than down them, by the Spanish naming system. Zamora was resettled rather by Castilians, who were at the heart of Roman Spain, representing the Celt-Iberians brought into the Roman Empire. Castille was the power behind the Reconquista, which was completed by Ferdinand and Isabella in the time of Columbus, and the growth of the subsequent Spanish Empire. Fernandez Duro focused on this period, writing himself a history of Zamora (see below).

Fernández Duro was baptized in the parish of San Andrés, where the family must have lived. The church was the social center of the parish. At some time during the next 15 years he received a primary education (reading writing, and arithmetic), probably several years' worth. The dates vary in the sources. The formal schooling took place at Madrid, to which the family moved temporarily, probably for the purpose. His very attendance at school is a strong indication of his membership in the aristocracy.

Americans and Western Europeans today take for granted mandatory free primary education, almost everyone being able to read and write. In 1860 only 20.1% of the population of Spain was literate; that is, could read and write, and similar figures are true for the rest of Europe. The common people did not go to school. Only in America (the United States) did the founding fathers insist that free education was the birthright and obligation of a free people, and that they cannot be free without it. Every American community had its one-room school and its teacher maintained at public expense. The issue is still being debated at the college level. The American ideal passed to Europe even in the lifetime of Fernandez Duro. In the late 19th century, at the peak of his career, the British were only beginning to convert parish schools into community schools. The "public schools" existed, but they were not for the general public, only for that portion which could afford them, and the same applies to Spain and the other nations.

Naval career
At the age of 15 years, in 1845, Fernández Duro became a candidate in the Naval School of San Fernando. In 1847 he shipped as a midshipman on the Isabel II, sailing in the Caribbean for three years. In 1851 he embarked on the Villa de Bilbao for the Philippines, where he took part in the Jornada de Joló (Day of Joló), near the island of Joló, now Sulu), in the Sulu Archipelago of the Pacific Ocean, between Mindanao and Borneo. For his courageous conduct during the battle,  he received the Cross of the Order of San Fernando. Upon returning to Spain as first midshipman, he was assigned to the Canary Islands Hydrographic Commission. Despite his age and station, he was inducted as an honorary member of the Academy of Fine Arts in Santa Cruz de Tenerife.

In 1853, he sailed as an ensign aboard the corvette Ferrolana in the Mediterranean, visiting France and Italy. In 1857 he was appointed professor at the Naval College, being responsible for the text of Cosmography.

In 1860 he took part in the Hispano-Moroccan War in command of the steamer Ferrolano, and drafted a report on the port, city and fortifications of Mogador.  Subsequently, he was awarded the Cross of the Royal Navy Diadem and the rank of Commander of Infantry for his distinguished service. He then returned to the West Indies and took part in the Prim expedition to Mexico as Secretary of the General Commander of Operations of the Fleet. After being stationed in the Naval Station at Havana, he returned to Madrid and held a post in the Ministry of the Navy. On the occasion of the mandate in Cuba of Capitán General Caballero de Rodas he was appointed by the Ministry of Overseas to the post of Secretary of the Government Superior of Cuba, (1869–70).

Scholar and historian

Still in Madrid, he participated in conferences and organized expeditions to Ifni, on the Atlantic coast of Morocco, to investigate the correct location of the ancient possession of Santa Cruz de la Mar Pequeña. He conducted research on Columbus and his lawsuits, the Santa Maria and the Galleons, as well as writing historical works, including the multi-volume History of the Spanish Navy; also histories of Castile, the City of Zamora, and others. He participated in the archaeological study of the Santa Maria.

Fernández Duro was then made aide-de-camp to King Alfonso XII, and because of his prestige, knowledge and experience, he was appointed arbitrator in determining the boundary between Colombia and Venezuela. In 1881 he entered the Royal Academy of History, and in 1898 he was appointed Perpetual Secretary of the same. Shortly before his death, being already seriously ill, he received the Award of Merit from the Academy.

Literary works
Fernández Duro wrote more than 400 publications including books, monographs, reports and memoirs, particularly on three subjects: the history of the Spanish Navy, the conquest of America and the history of the province of Zamora. On this last topic he wrote a collection of news-biographical literature relating to Zamora or materials for its history (Madrid: Manuel Tello, 1891), which was awarded in 1876. The book is divided into three sections: a regional bibliography of works dealing with Zamora, a bibliography of works on the history of the press in Zamora and a bio-bibliography of famous Zamoran persons. As for his work on the history of the Spanish Navy, his History of the Spanish Armada from the Union of Castile and Aragon (1895–1903) in nine volumes, and his Nautical Disquisitions (1876–1881) in six, remain unsurpassed in their field today.

 
 
 Ficha del autor en la Biblioteca Virtual Cervantes
 como autor: Fernández Duro, Cesáreo, 1830-1908 in the Biblioteca Digital de Castilla y León

Footnotes

Bibliography

Attribution
 This article incorporates information from the equivalent article on the Spanish Wikipedia.

External links

1830 births
1908 deaths
People from Zamora, Spain
Spanish naval historians
Spanish naval officers